Mark V or Mark 5 often refers to the fifth version of a product, frequently military hardware. "Mark", meaning "model" or "variant", can be abbreviated "Mk."

Mark V or Mark 5 can specifically refer to:

In technology

In military and weaponry
 BL 13.5 inch Mk V naval gun (1912); British gun that was a defining feature of the super-dreadnought Orion-class battleships
 QF 4 inch Mk V naval gun (1914); British naval gun used for coastal defense and anti-aircraft
 Mark V tank, a series of variations of the World War I Mark I tank
 Mark V Composite tank in Estonian service; specific design and service of the Mark V tank as used by Estonia
 BL 8-inch howitzer Mk I – V; World War I British gun, heavy and short-range
 Mk 5 mine (1943); British anti-tank mine used in World War II
 Supermarine Spitfire Mk V; 1941 British fighter aircraft augmented with high-altitude capability
 Mark 5 nuclear bomb (1952–1963); American nuclear bomb
 Mark V Special Operations Craft (1995), a small marine security/patrol/transport boat used by the United States Navy
 Weatherby Mark V, the main line of rifles from Weatherby, Inc.
 MarkV-A1, a bomb disposal robot designed by Northrop Grumman
 Mk V or Covenanter tank, a British Cruiser tank of the Second World War

Other vehicles
 Bentley Mark V (1931–1941), a British luxury car
 Jaguar Mark V (1948–1951), a British saloon car
 Continental Mark V (1960, 1977–1979), an American personal luxury car 
 Mark V monorail (1987–2008), monorail train used at Disneyland in Anaheim, California
 Volkswagen Golf Mk V (2003–2009), 3 and 5 door hatchback with many styling and performance options
 British Rail Mark 5 (InterCity 250), an unbuilt type of coach intended as part of the planned InterCity 250 project for the West Coast Main Line
 British Rail Mark 5 (CAF), a type of passenger coach used for the Caledonian Sleeper 
 British Rail Mark 5A, a type of coach to be used by TransPennine Express

People
 Pope Mark V of Alexandria, the Coptic Pope of Alexandria and Patriarch of the See of St. Mark between 1610 and 1621
 Patriarch Mark V of Alexandria, the Orthodox Patriarch of Alexandria between 1425 and 1435
 Mark V Shaney; fake Usenet user that used Markov chain techniques to determine 'his' post text

Other uses
 Mark 5 or Mark V, the fifth chapter of the Gospel of Mark in the New Testament of the Christian Bible
 The Mark V in the Mesa Boogie Mark Series, a guitar amplifier manufactured by Mesa/Boogie